1. deild kvenna (English: Women's 1st Division), also known as Grill 66 deild kvenna for sponsorship reasons, is the second-tier women's handball competition among clubs in Iceland. It is managed by the Icelandic Handball Association. The current champions are KA/Þór who won their first title in 2018.

Past champions

Source

Awards

Player of the Year
2017 - Martha Hermannsdóttir
2018 - Martha Hermannsdóttir

Young player of the Year
2017 - Andrea Jacobsen
2018 - Þóra María Sigurjónsdóttir

Coach of the Year
2017 - Jónatan Þór Magnússon
2018 - Jónatan Þór  Magnússon

External links 
 Grill 66 deild kvenna 2017-2018

References

Handball leagues in Iceland
Sports leagues established in 1973
1973 establishments in Iceland